Balabitene, Belahuit, or Belabitene was a region in historic Armenia. It was named for the family that ruled it, on the former territory of the Lope or Puli people.

See also
List of regions of ancient Armenia

References

Early medieval Armenian regions